The German Society for Hygiene and Microbiology (DGHM), formerly known as the Society for Microbiology, is a German medical society, which works to advance research in the fields of infectious diseases and microbiology. It was founded in 1906.

References 

Medical associations based in Germany
Microbiology organizations
1906 in science
1906 in Germany
Scientific societies based in Germany